The WWA World Trios Championship (Campeonato Mundial de Trios WWA in Spanish) is a six-man (or trios) Tag Team Championship in the Mexican lucha libre (Professional wrestling) promotion World Wrestling Association (WWA) in Mexico. It was first won by Zandokan, Khaos I and Sicodelico around 1989 and was defended throughout Mexico until it was abandoned in 1998. 

As it was a professional wrestling championship, the championship was not won not by actual competition, but by a scripted ending to a match determined by the bookers and match makers. On occasion the promotion declares a championship vacant, which means there is no champion at that point in time. This can either be due to a storyline, or real life issues such as a champion suffering an injury being unable to defend the championship, or leaving the company.

Title history

Footnotes

References

External links
W.W.A. World Trios Title
WWA World Trios Title

Trios wrestling tag team championships
World Wrestling Association (Mexico) Championships